Koninklijke Bibliotheek (Royal Library in English) may refer to:
 Royal Library of Belgium, the country's national library, in Brussels
 Royal Library of the Netherlands, in The Hague